Di Piero is an Italian surname. Notable people with the surname include:

Meo di Piero (active 1356–1407), Italian painter
Tommaso di Piero (1464–1529), Italian painter
W. S. Di Piero (born 1945), American poet, translator, essayist, and educator

Italian-language surnames
Patronymic surnames
Surnames from given names